In functional analysis and related areas of mathematics, locally convex topological vector spaces (LCTVS) or locally convex spaces are examples of topological vector spaces (TVS) that generalize normed spaces. They can be defined as topological vector spaces whose topology is generated by translations of balanced, absorbent, convex sets. Alternatively they can be defined as a vector space with a family of seminorms, and a topology can be defined in terms of that family. Although in general such spaces are not necessarily normable, the existence of a convex local base for the zero vector is strong enough for the Hahn–Banach theorem to hold, yielding a sufficiently rich theory of continuous linear functionals.

Fréchet spaces are locally convex spaces that are completely metrizable (with a choice of complete metric). They are generalizations of Banach spaces, which are complete vector spaces with respect to a metric generated by a norm.

History

Metrizable topologies on vector spaces have been studied since their introduction in Maurice Fréchet's 1902 PhD thesis Sur quelques points du calcul fonctionnel (wherein the notion of a metric was first introduced). 
After the notion of a general topological space was defined by Felix Hausdorff in 1914, although locally convex topologies were implicitly used by some mathematicians, up to 1934 only John von Neumann would seem to have explicitly defined the weak topology on Hilbert spaces and strong operator topology on operators on Hilbert spaces. Finally, in 1935 von Neumann introduced the general definition of a locally convex space (called a convex space by him).

A notable example of a result which had to wait for the development and dissemination of general locally convex spaces (amongst other notions and results, like nets, the product topology and Tychonoff's theorem) to be proven in its full generality, is the Banach–Alaoglu theorem which Stefan Banach first established in 1932 by an elementary diagonal argument for the case of separable normed spaces (in which case the unit ball of the dual is metrizable).

Definition

Suppose  is a vector space over  a subfield of the complex numbers (normally  itself or ). 
A locally convex space is defined either in terms of convex sets, or equivalently in terms of seminorms.

Definition via convex sets

 Convex if for all  and   In other words,  contains all line segments between points in 
 Circled if for all  and scalars  if  then   If  this means that  is equal to its reflection through the origin.  For  it means for any   contains the circle through  centred on the origin, in the one-dimensional complex subspace generated by 
 A cone (when the underlying field is ordered) if for all  and  
 Absorbent or absorbing if for every  there exists  such that  for all  satisfying  The set  can be scaled out by any "large" value to absorb every point in the space.
 In any TVS, every neighborhood of the origin is absorbent. 
 Absolutely convex or a disk if it is both balanced and convex.

A topological vector space (TVS) is called locally convex if the origin has a neighborhood basis (that is, a local base) consisting of convex sets.

In fact, every locally convex TVS has a neighborhood basis of the origin consisting of  sets (that is, disks), where this neighborhood basis can further be chosen to also consist entirely of open sets or entirely of closed sets. 
Every TVS has a neighborhood basis at the origin consisting of balanced sets but only a locally convex TVS has a neighborhood basis at the origin consisting of sets that are both balanced  convex. It is possible for a TVS to have  neighborhoods of the origin that are convex and yet  be locally convex.

Because translation is (by definition of "topological vector space") continuous, all translations are homeomorphisms, so every base for the neighborhoods of the origin can be translated to a base for the neighborhoods of any given vector.

Definition via seminorms

  is nonnegative or positive semidefinite: ;
  is positive homogeneous or positive scalable:  for every scalar  So, in particular, ;
  is subadditive.  It satisfies the triangle inequality: 

If  satisfies positive definiteness, which states that if  then  then  is a norm. 
While in general seminorms need not be norms, there is an analogue of this criterion for families of seminorms, separatedness, defined below.

Definition (second version): A locally convex space is defined to be a vector space  along with a family  of seminorms on

Seminorm topology

Suppose that  is a vector space over  where  is either the real or complex numbers.

That the vector space operations are continuous in this topology follows from properties 2 and 3 above. 

Basis and subbases

The family of sets  as  ranges over a family of seminorms  and  ranges over the positive real numbers
These sets are convex, as follows from properties 2 and 3 of seminorms.
Intersections of finitely many such sets are then also convex, and since the collection of all such finite intersections is a basis at the origin it follows that the topology is locally convex in the sense of the  definition given above. 

thus it suffices to define the topology at the origin. 

Bases of seminorms and saturated families

This forms a basis at the origin rather than merely a subbasis so that in particular, there is  need to take finite intersections of such sets.

Basis of norms

This is because the sum of a norm and a seminorm is a norm so if a locally convex space is defined by some family  of seminorms (each of which is necessarily continuous) then the family  of (also continuous) norms obtained by adding some given continuous norm  to each element, will necessarily be a family of norms that defines this same locally convex topology. 
If there exists a continuous norm on a topological vector space  then  is necessarily Hausdorff but the converse is not in general true (not even for locally convex spaces or Fréchet spaces).

Nets

Equivalence of definitions

Although the definition in terms of a neighborhood base gives a better geometric picture, the definition in terms of seminorms is easier to work with in practice. 
The equivalence of the two definitions follows from a construction known as the Minkowski functional or Minkowski gauge. 
The key feature of seminorms which ensures the convexity of their -balls is the triangle inequality.

From this definition it follows that  is a seminorm if  is balanced and convex (it is also absorbent by assumption).  Conversely, given a family of seminorms, the sets

form a base of convex absorbent balanced sets.

Ways of defining a locally convex topology

Example: auxiliary normed spaces

This guarantees that the Minkowski functional  of  will be a seminorm on  thereby making  into a seminormed space that carries its canonical pseduometrizable topology. If  is a topological vector space and if this convex absorbing subset  is also a bounded subset of  then the absorbing disk  will also be bounded, in which case  will be a norm and  will form what is known as an auxiliary normed space.

Further definitions

 A family of seminorms  is called total or separated or is said to separate points if whenever  holds for every  then  is necessarily   A locally convex space is Hausdorff if and only if it has a separated family of seminorms.  Many authors take the Hausdorff criterion in the definition.
 A pseudometric is a generalization of a metric which does not satisfy the condition that  only when   A locally convex space is pseudometrizable, meaning that its topology arises from a pseudometric, if and only if it has a countable family of seminorms. This pseudometric is translation-invariant, but not homogeneous, meaning  and therefore does not define a (pseudo)norm. The pseudometric is an honest metric if and only if the family of seminorms is separated, since this is the case if and only if the space is Hausdorff. If furthermore the space is complete, the space is called a Fréchet space.
 As with any topological vector space, a locally convex space is also a uniform space.  Thus one may speak of uniform continuity, uniform convergence, and Cauchy sequences.
 A Cauchy net  in a locally convex space is a net  such that for every  and every seminorm  there exists some index  such that for all indices    In other words, the net must be Cauchy in all the seminorms simultaneously.  The definition of completeness is given here in terms of nets instead of the more familiar sequences because unlike Fréchet spaces which are metrizable, general spaces may be defined by an uncountable family of pseudometrics.  Sequences, which are countable by definition, cannot suffice to characterize convergence in such spaces.  A locally convex space is complete if and only if every Cauchy net converges.
 A family of seminorms becomes a preordered set under the relation  if and only if there exists an  such that for all   One says it is a directed family of seminorms if the family is a directed set with addition as the join, in other words if for every  and  there is a  such that   Every family of seminorms has an equivalent directed family, meaning one which defines the same topology.
 If the topology of the space is induced from a single seminorm, then the space is seminormable. Any locally convex space with a finite family of seminorms is seminormable. Moreover, if the space is Hausdorff (the family is separated), then the space is normable, with norm given by the sum of the seminorms. In terms of the open sets, a locally convex topological vector space is seminormable if and only if the origin has a bounded neighborhood.

Sufficient conditions

Hahn–Banach extension property

Let  be a TVS. 
Say that  has the Hahn-Banach extension property (HBEP) if every vector subspace of  has the extension property.

The Hahn-Banach theorem guarantees that every Hausdorff locally convex space has the HBEP. 
For complete metrizable TVSs there is a converse:

If a vector space  has uncountable dimension and if we endow it with the finest vector topology then this is a TVS with the HBEP that is neither locally convex or metrizable.

Properties

Throughout,  is a family of continuous seminorms that generate the topology of 

Topological closure

If  and  then  if and only if for every  and every finite collection  there exists some  such that  

Topology of Hausdorff locally convex spaces

Every Hausdorff locally convex space is homeomorphic to a vector subspace of a product of Banach spaces. 

Properties of convex subsets

Algebraic properties of convex subsets

A subset  is convex if and only if  for all  or equivalently, if and only if  for all positive real  where because  always holds, the equals sign  can be replaced with  If  is a convex set that contains the origin then  is star shaped at the origin and for all non-negative real   

The Minkowski sum of two convex sets is convex; furthermore, the scalar multiple of a convex set is again convex. 

Topological properties of convex subsets

 Suppose that  is a TVS (not necessarily locally convex or Hausdorff) over the real or complex numbers.
 The interior and closure of a convex subset of a TVS is again convex.
 So if the interior of a convex set  is non-empty then  is a closed (respectively, open) set if and only if it is a regular closed (respectively, regular open) set.
 In a locally convex space, the convex hull and the disked hull of a totally bounded set is totally bounded.
 In a complete locally convex space, the convex hull and the disked hull of a compact set are both compact.
 More generally, if  is a compact subset of a locally convex space, then the convex hull  (respectively, the disked hull ) is compact if and only if it is complete.
 In a locally convex space, convex hulls of bounded sets are bounded. This is not true for TVSs in general.
 In a Fréchet space, the closed convex hull of a compact set is compact.
 In a locally convex space, any linear combination of totally bounded sets is totally bounded.

Properties of convex hulls

 The convex hull of compact subset of a Hilbert space is  necessarily closed and so also  necessarily compact. However, like in all complete Hausdorff locally convex spaces, the  convex hull  of this compact subset is compact. This shows that in a Hausdorff locally convex space that is not complete, the closed convex hull of compact subset might  to be compact (although it will be precompact/totally bounded).
 In a Hausdorff locally convex space  the closed convex hull  of compact subset  is not necessarily compact although it is a precompact (also called "totally bounded") subset, which means that its closure,   of  will be compact (here  so that  if and only if  is complete); that is to say,  will be compact.
 In a quasi-complete locally convex TVS, the closure of the convex hull of a compact subset is again compact.
 In a Hausdorff locally convex TVS, the convex hull of a precompact set is again precompact. Consequently, in a complete Hausdorff locally convex space, the closed convex hull of a compact subset is again compact.
 In any TVS, the convex hull of a finite union of compact convex sets is compact (and convex).
 In general, the closed convex hull of a compact set is not necessarily compact.
 In any non-Hausdorff TVS, there exist subsets that are compact (and thus complete) but  closed.
 The bipolar theorem states that the bipolar (that is, the polar of the polar) of a subset of a locally convex Hausdorff TVS is equal to the closed convex balanced hull of that set.
 The balanced hull of a convex set is  necessarily convex.
 If  are subsets of a TVS  and if  is a scalar then    and  Moreover, if  is compact then  However, the convex hull of a closed set need not be closed; for example, the set  is closed in  but its convex hull is the open set  
 If  are subsets of a TVS  whose closed convex hulls are compact, then 
 If  is a convex set in a complex vector space  and there exists some  such that  then  for all real  such that  In particular,  for all scalars  such that 

Examples and nonexamples

Finest and coarsest locally convex topology

Coarsest vector topology

Any vector space  endowed with the trivial topology (also called the indiscrete topology) is a locally convex TVS (and of course, it is the coarsest such topology). 
This topology is Hausdorff if and only  
The indiscrete topology makes any vector space into a complete pseudometrizable locally convex TVS.

In contrast, the discrete topology forms a vector topology on  if and only 
This follows from the fact that every topological vector space is a connected space.

Finest locally convex topology

This topology may also be described as the TVS-topology on  having as a neighborhood base at the origin the set of all absorbing disks in  
 is Hausdorff. 
Every linear map from  into another locally convex TVS is necessarily continuous.
therefore, if  is infinite dimensional then  is not pseudometrizable (and thus not metrizable). 
The space  is a bornological space.

Examples of locally convex spaces

Every normed space is a Hausdorff locally convex space, and much of the theory of locally convex spaces generalizes parts of the theory of normed spaces. 
The family of seminorms can be taken to be the single norm. 

More generally, every Fréchet space is locally convex.
A Fréchet space can be defined as a complete locally convex space with a separated countable family of seminorms.

The space  of real valued sequences with the family of seminorms given by

is locally convex. The countable family of seminorms is complete and separable, so this is a Fréchet space, which is not normable.

Given any vector space  and a collection  of linear functionals on it,  can be made into a locally convex topological vector space by giving it the weakest topology making all linear functionals in  continuous. This is known as the weak topology or the initial topology determined by  

Spaces of differentiable functions give other non-normable examples.
It is known as the Schwartz space, or the space of functions of rapid decrease, and its dual space is the space of tempered distributions.

An important function space in functional analysis is the space  of smooth functions with compact support in  
A more detailed construction is needed for the topology of this space because the space  is not complete in the uniform norm.
Such a limit of Fréchet spaces is known as an LF space.
This space is locally convex and complete. However, it is not metrizable, and so it is not a Fréchet space.

More abstractly, given a topological space  the space  of continuous (not necessarily bounded) functions on  can be given the topology of uniform convergence on compact sets. This topology is defined by semi-norms  (as  varies over the directed set of all compact subsets of ). When  is locally compact (for example, an open set in ) the Stone–Weierstrass theorem applies—in the case of real-valued functions, any subalgebra of  that separates points and contains the constant functions (for example, the subalgebra of polynomials) is dense.

Examples of spaces lacking local convexity

Many topological vector spaces are locally convex. Examples of spaces that lack local convexity include the following:

 The space of measurable functions on the unit interval  (where we identify two functions that are equal almost everywhere) has a vector-space topology defined by the translation-invariant metric (which induces the convergence in measure of measurable functions; for random variables, convergence in measure is convergence in probability):  This space is often denoted 

Both examples have the property that any continuous linear map to the real numbers is  In particular, their dual space is trivial, that is, it contains only the zero functional.

 The sequence space   is not locally convex.

Continuous mappings

Because locally convex spaces are topological spaces as well as vector spaces, the natural functions to consider between two locally convex spaces are continuous linear maps. 
Using the seminorms, a necessary and sufficient criterion for the continuity of a linear map can be given that closely resembles the more familiar boundedness condition found for Banach spaces.

If the family  is a directed family, and it can always be chosen to be directed as explained above, then the formula becomes even simpler and more familiar:

The class of all locally convex topological vector spaces forms a category with continuous linear maps as morphisms.

Linear functionals

Multilinear maps

Let  be an integer,  be TVSs (not necessarily locally convex), let  be a locally convex TVS whose topology is determined by a family  of continuous seminorms, and let  be a multilinear operator that is linear in each of its  coordinates. 
The following are equivalent: 

  is continuous.
 For every  there exist continuous seminorms  on  respectively, such that  for all 

See also

Notes

References

  
  
 . 
  
  
  
  
  
  
  
  
  
  
  
  
  
  

Convex analysis
Functional analysis
Topological vector spaces